The Kellerjoch is a 2,344 m-high mountain above the Inn valley near Schwaz in Tyrol, Austria.

External links 

 tiris: official map work
 Kellerjochbahn (with opening times)
 (New) Kellerjoch Hut
 (New) Kellerjoch Hut, postcard, painted by Max Angerer (1877–1955)

Mountains of the Alps
Mountains of Tyrol (state)
Two-thousanders of Austria
Tux Alps